Alfred Hubert Nichols (28 November 1890 – 1 May 1952) was a British athlete who competed mainly in the Cross Country Team. He competed for Great Britain in the 1920 Summer Olympics held in Antwerp, Belgium in the Cross Country Team where he won the silver medal with his team mates James Wilson and Anton Hegarty.

References

External links
 

1890 births
1952 deaths
Athletes from London
English male long-distance runners
Olympic athletes of Great Britain
Olympic silver medallists for Great Britain
Athletes (track and field) at the 1920 Summer Olympics
International Cross Country Championships winners
Medalists at the 1920 Summer Olympics
Olympic silver medalists in athletics (track and field)
Olympic cross country runners